Celso Brandão (born 1951 in Maceio, Alagoas, Brazil) is a photographer who also directed a few documentaries. He can always be found at his headquarters in Carababa Beach , just a few minutes from the city center. Some of his work belong the Pirelli Collection of 1996  He has also received several awards at the Festival do Cinema Brasileiro de Penedo in the years 1975, 1976, 1978, 1979 and 1980. At the moment his is back doing a few documentaries and teaching photography at Federal University of Alagoas.

Filmography 

 Filé de Pombal da Barra - 1977 10' Super8
 Mandioca da terra à mesa. 1977 10'
 Benedito: o santeiro. - 1985 24'
 Dede Mamata - 1988
 Ponto das Ervas. 11'
 A Singeleza da Singeleza. 4'
 A casa de santo - 1986 13'
 Memória da vida e do trabalho (1ª Mostra Internacional do Filme Etnográfico)
 Chão de casa - 1982 (1ª Mostra Internacional do Filme Etnográfico)
 Mestra Hilda
 
 O Lambe-Sola - Celso Brandão's views on the popular poet Antonio Aurélio de Morais

Photography 
 Nucleo de estudos afro-brasileiros - UFAL 
 KARIRI 
 1993 – Fotografia Brasileira Contemporânea: anos 70 a 80, 1º Mês Internacional da Fotografia, Sesc Pompéia, São Paulo
 1993 – Argueiro, um Cisco no Olho, Galeria Fotoptica, São Paulo
 2002 – Canudos, Instituto Moreira Salles, Rio de Janeiro
 2001 - Semana do Indio - FUNAI
 2007 - Art pictures for Tania Pedrosa 
 2007 - Exposição de fotografias Acenda uma Vela

References

External links
 

1951 births
Living people
Brazilian photographers
Brazilian film directors
People from Maceió